Nataliya Vladimirovna Lobanova (née Kuznetsova; , 30 May 1947 – 1998) was a Russian diver. She competed in the 10 m platform at the 1964, 1968 and 1972 Summer Olympics and finished in seventh, second and thirteenth place, respectively. In 1972 she also finished 14th in the 3 m springboard. 

At the European Championships she won a gold medal in the platform in 1966 and a bronze in the springboard in 1962. She was Soviet champion in the platform in 1969 and 1972.

References

1947 births
1998 deaths
Russian female divers
Olympic divers of the Soviet Union
Divers at the 1964 Summer Olympics
Divers at the 1968 Summer Olympics
Divers at the 1972 Summer Olympics
Olympic silver medalists for the Soviet Union
Olympic medalists in diving
Medalists at the 1968 Summer Olympics